The Violent Patriot is a 1956 Italian adventure film directed by Sergio Grieco. It is loosely based on real life events of the Italian condottiero Giovanni dalle Bande Nere.

Cast 

Vittorio Gassman as  Giovanni dalle Bande Nere 
Constance Smith as Lady Emma
Anna Maria Ferrero: Anna
Gérard Landry as Gasparo
Silvio Bagolini as Lumaca, the hunchback servant
Ubaldo Lay as Stefano, Anna's father
Philippe Hersent as Friar Salvatore 
Andrea Aureli as Count de Lautrec

See also 
Condottieri (1937)
The Profession of Arms (2001)

References

External links

1956 films
1950s historical adventure films
Italian historical adventure films
Films directed by Sergio Grieco
Films set in the 16th century
1950s Italian films